The NS 5300 class were the first of this class in The Netherlands, in fact the NRS employed the first passenger service tender locomotives with this type. The Westinghouse brake system was a first for the NRS; the additional hand brake was common. To obtain a stable ride at high speeds, inside cylinders were employed. The firebox was situated between the coupled axles. The front and rear axles were of the Webb type, already employed by the London North Western Railway. The radial axle boxes were produced with very fine tolerances. Rubber bumpers were employed to move the axle back into position.

Locomotives Nos. 285 and 287 transferred to the SS, while locomotives 284 and 286 were transferred to the HSM at the termination of the NRS. Both HSM locomotives were sold before the merger of HSM and SS to NS. HSM 310 (old 386) was sold to Spoorweg-Maatschappij Gent-Terneuzen, where it remained in service until 1915. HSM 309 (former 384) was sold to the Amsterdamse Ballast Maatschappij in 1918, where it remained in service until 1930. Units 285 and 287 were renumbered 1285 and 1287 by the SS.

A second series of the same type of locomotives was ordered by the Nederlandsche Zuid Ooster Spoorweg Maatschappij (NOZS). Initially, six engines were ordered for service on its Nijmegen-Den Bosch-Tilburg route; later another two machines were added. These machines did not have the safety valve that was present on the NRS machines. These machines entered service in 1882 and 1883. At the merger of the SS, into which the NZOS had been merged, into the NS, these machines were employed by the NS to run local trains, together with the two units transferred via the SS. The SS numbers were 267–274.

During their later operating years, some engines got outfitted with serve-pipes which put the heated surface to 107.5 m2 or 89.5 m2.

The NS renumbered the units 5301–5310 at the merger of SS and HSM in 1921. The former NZOS locomotives were numbered 5301–5308, whilst the NRS units were numbered 5309 and 5310. They were classified as PT3 by NS. The locomotives were retired between 1925 and 1935. All have been scrapped.

Overview

References
Notes

Sources
 H. Waldorp: Onze Nederlandse stoomlocomotieven in woord en beeld. Uitg. De Alk, Alkmaar, 1981. .
 J. van der Meer: De Hollandsche IJzeren Spoorweg-Maatschappij. Uitg. Uquilair, 2009, .
 J.J. Karskens: De Locomotieven van de Hollandsche IJzeren Spoorweg Maatschappij. Uitg. J.H. Gottmer, Haarlem – Antwerpen, 1947.
 A. Weijts: Tussen vuur en stoom. Uitg. Europese Bibliotheek, Zaltbommel, 2001. .

Steam locomotives of the Netherlands
Sharp Stewart locomotives
NBL locomotives
Maatschappij tot Exploitatie van Staatsspoorwegen